United Nations Security Council resolution 1079, adopted unanimously on 15 November 1996, after recalling previous resolutions on Croatia including 1023 (1995), 1025 (1995), 1037 (1996), 1043 (1996) and 1069 (1996), the Council extended the mandate of the United Nations Transitional Authority for Eastern Slavonia, Baranja and Western Sirmium (UNTAES) until 15 July 1997.

The Security Council welcomed the progress that UNTAES had made in facilitating the return of the territories to Croatia. The Basic Agreement between Croatia and the local Serbs asked for a temporary United Nations administration for 12 months and that it could be extended for another year at the request of one of the parties, which the local Serbs asked for. The Secretary-General Boutros Boutros-Ghali had requested UNTAES be extended by six months.

Croatia and the local Serb community were called together to work with UNTAES to create circumstances in which local elections could take place. Both also had to comply with the Basic Agreement and to the respect the rights of all ethnic groups. The right of refugees to return home had to be respected while both parties were responsible for the effective functioning of the police.

Finally, the Secretary-General was requested to report on developments by 15 February and 1 July 1997, and to submit recommendations concerning the restructuring of UNTAES and the United Nations presence in Croatia.

See also
 Bosnian War
 Breakup of Yugoslavia
 Croatian War of Independence
 Dayton Agreement
 List of United Nations Security Council Resolutions 1001 to 1100 (1995–1997)
 Yugoslav Wars
 United Nations Transitional Authority for Eastern Slavonia, Baranja and Western Sirmium
 Eastern Slavonia, Baranja and Western Syrmia (1995–1998)
 Joint Council of Municipalities

References

External links
 
Text of the Resolution at undocs.org

 1079
 1079
1996 in Yugoslavia
1996 in Croatia
 1079
Joint Council of Municipalities
November 1996 events